Stadion MOSiR ("MOSiR Stadium") may refer to various stadiums in Poland, including:
 Stadion MOSiR (Bystrzyca)
 Stadion MOSiR (Gdańsk) – now known as Gdańsk Sports Center Stadium
 Stadion MOSiR (Stalowa Wola)
 Stadion MOSiR (Wodzisław Śląski)